Truth Social (stylized as TRUTH Social) is a social media platform created by Trump Media & Technology Group, an American media and technology company founded in October 2021 by former U.S. president Donald Trump. It has been called a competitor to Parler and Gab in trying to provide an uncensored alternative to Twitter and Facebook.

The service was launched on February 21, 2022. , it was ranked number 101 in Apple's App Store rankings for social media apps, and SimilarWeb ranked its website as number 203 in their "News & Media Publishers" category, behind Gab at number 154, but ahead of Parler at number 1,052.

From mid-2022, Truth Social was reported to be facing financial and regulatory issues. The Truth Social app was originally not available on Google Play because of violations of Google policies prohibiting content with physical threats and incitement to violence, but was approved for Google Play in October 2022 after agreeing to enforce policies against incitement.

History

Background 
Former U.S. president Donald Trump raised the prospect of building a new social media platform after he was banned from Facebook and Twitter in 2021, following the 2021 United States Capitol attack. In May 2021, Trump launched "From the Desk of Donald J. Trump", a web page where he posted short tweet-like announcements; it was shut down after less than a month, with Trump's senior aide Jason Miller confirming it would not be coming back.

Inception 
According to Reuters, two members of the cast of Trump's TV show The Apprentice, Wes Moss and Andy Litinsky, were "central" to the founding of Truth Social's parent company, the Trump Media & Technology Group (TMTG), having allegedly pitched the idea of a social network to Trump in January 2021.

Blank-check company and Chinese finance 
To facilitate becoming a publicly traded company, a special-purpose acquisition company (SPAC) called Digital World Acquisition Corp (DWAC) was created with the help of ARC Capital, a Shanghai-based firm specializing in listing Chinese companies on American stock markets that has been a target of SEC investigations for misrepresenting shell corporations. Led by former Mexican government official and China-based banker Abraham Cinta, ARC Capital's global links included offices in Shanghai, Wuhan, Mexico City, and Jakarta, which Bloomberg News described as "surprising", due to Trump's comments on various foreign countries in office. Some investors were surprised to learn their investment money was being used to finance a Trump company. The DWAC chief executive Patrick Orlando, a Florida-based financier and former Deutsche Bank trader, was also the chief executive of the Wuhan-based Yunhong Holdings/Yunhong International, registered in the offshore tax haven of the Cayman Islands. In an October 2021 SEC filing, the special-purpose acquisition company Yunhong International stated its goal was to "capitalize on growing opportunities created by consumer/lifestyle businesses that have their primary operations in Asia." An additional backer of the Trump social media venture, becoming the CFO of Digital World Acquisition, was Brazilian parliamentarian Luiz Philippe of Orléans-Braganza, a monarchist allied with Jair Bolsonaro.

Russian finance 
According to The Guardian, in December 2021, two loans totaling $8 million were paid to Trump Media from obscure Putin-connected entities as the company was "on the brink of collapse". $2 million was paid by Paxum Bank, part-owned by Anton Postolnikov, a relation of Aleksandr Smirnov, a former Russian government official who now runs the Russian maritime company Rosmorport. $6 million was paid by an ostensibly separate entity, ES Family Trust, whose director was the director of Paxum Bank at the same time. As of March 2023, prosecutors in the US Attorney for the Southern District of New York were investigating the Russian ties.

Promotion and early reception 
In October 2021, TMTG published a document outlining the Truth Social platform, citing a poll saying one-third of the U.S. population polled had stated they would use a social media platform endorsed by Trump. On October 20, TMTG issued a press release announcing the platform would have its public launch in "the first quarter of 2022." It was slated to enter limited beta for Apple iOS in November 2021, and though it did not meet this schedule for its beta testing, Trump claimed in December 2021 "invited guests" were already using the beta system.

Hours after the press release, a person identifying themselves as a part of the hacker collective Anonymous used Shodan to discover domains related to the company, eventually locating what appeared to be a publicly-accessible mobile beta of the service. The URL, which permitted users to sign up and use the platform, was leaked across social media. Users began trolling, creating parody accounts, and posting rants and memes. Users were able to sign up with usernames of high-profile individuals including Trump, Mike Pence, and Jack Dorsey. The link was later taken offline.

Reactions 
The New York Times described Truth Social as an addition to the field of already-existing alt-tech platforms.  BBC journalist James Clayton stated the platform could be a more successful version of other alt-tech social media platforms like Parler and Gab and is an attempt by Trump to gain his "megaphone" back. Gettr CEO Jason Miller, a former Trump advisor, praised Truth Social and said the platform will cause Facebook and Twitter to "lose even more market share". Gab said in a statement it supports Truth Social and users of Gab can follow Trump on his reserved Gab account.

Among critical reactions, Chris Cillizza of CNN wrote that the platform was doomed to fail. Noah Berlatsky, writing for The Independent, described it as a "potential threat to democracy". The Forward raised concerns of antisemitism becoming prominent on the platform, noting similar platforms have become known for hosting antisemitic content, such as Parler, Gab, and Telegram. Rolling Stone observed that while Truth Social promises to be an open and free platform, Truth Social's terms of service include a clause stating users cannot disparage the service. The New York Times expressed skepticism about whether Truth Social would be able to compete effectively against rival services.

Platform

Personnel 

Truth Social is run by Trump Media & Technology Group, and headed by Devin Nunes. In 2022, Talking Points Memo stated Nunes' remuneration was $750,000 per year. Other senior employees included chief of technology Josh Adams and chief of product development Billy Boozer, who both subsequently left the company.

The company's headquarters are in Sarasota, Florida. The company was reported to have about 40 employees in March 2022.

Software 
Truth Social is modeled heavily after Twitter; users are able to make posts ("Truths", similar to tweets) and share other users' posts ("ReTruths", similar to retweets). The Truth Social platform uses a custom version of the free and open-source social network hosting software Mastodon as its backend, which omits several features, including polls and post visibility options.

The platform uses the Soapbox frontend, usually used with the Pleroma system, instead of Mastodon's native frontend. TMTG has advertised for developers with skills in using Elixir, the programming language used to build Pleroma.

On October 21, 2021, the Software Freedom Conservancy group stated they suspected Truth Social had violated Mastodon's AGPLv3 license by not offering its source code to all users. The Mastodon developers then formally requested that Truth Social comply with the terms of the software license, with Truth Social publishing its source code as a ZIP file on the website on November 12, 2021. On February 22, 2022, the source code download was moved to the website's legal section. A mirror of the source code is available at GitHub, where it was uploaded by uninvolved individuals.

The service is designed for access by web browsing and as an app for both Android and Apple devices:

In May 2022, the service launched a web app for accessing the service with an Internet browser, with geographical restrictions.
On August 30, 2022, Google stated Truth Social's content moderation did not meet its standards to be available on Google Play, the default distributor of Android apps, due to violation of Google's policies prohibiting content with physical threats and incitement to violence. On October 12, 2022, Truth Social was approved for Google Play after the platform implemented stronger content moderation policies.

Infrastructure 
The Truth Social service was originally hosted on RightForge, a company aimed at providing internet hosting for conservative causes that describes itself as "The first global Internet infrastructure company committed to American principles online".

On December 14, 2021, TMTG said it had partnered with the Canadian online video platform Rumble, which was already providing cloud services to the Truth Social beta service. On April 21, 2022, TMTG announced Truth Social would be moving to Rumble's cloud platform and announced they would be performing infrastructure upgrades to increase the platform's performance.

TMTG engaged the services of Hive, a content moderation company that uses machine learning to filter postings for unacceptable content.

, Truth Social uses Cloudflare as its CDN for both mobile and web traffic. Reuters reported Fastly had refused to take Truth Social on as a customer.

Content policies 
Truth Social was launched proclaiming itself as a "big tent" platform without political censorship, allowing for "free expression".

When the company was first announced in October 2021, its terms of service said the company would not be legally responsible for "the content, accuracy, offensiveness, opinions [or] reliability" of anything users might post to the service. Some commentators noted that this self-declared immunity appeared to rely on Section 230 of the Communications Decency Act, a law Trump firmly opposed during his presidency.

The original terms of service further added that users would be forbidden to "disparage, tarnish, or otherwise harm, in our opinion, us and/or the Site". Truth Social said it had the right to "suspend or terminate your account" and "take appropriate legal action". The anti-disparagement section of the terms of service was removed in late 2022. Sexual content remains forbidden by the terms of service.

Truth Social has blocked accounts for behavior it considers harmful or inappropriate, including accounts with parody names and death threats.

Censorship allegations 
The platform has been widely accused of censorship. In June 2022, several accounts were reportedly banned after posting about investigations into the 2021 United States Capitol attack and the publicly televised January 6 hearings that detailed events leading up to the mob violence on that day, in which Trump supporters breached the United States Congress, seeking to overturn the 2020 presidential election.

According to an August 2022 report from progressive consumer rights advocacy group Public Citizen, Truth Social was found to shadowban liberal and progressive users that disagree with the site's narrative, as well as a swathe of other content, including some conservative content. Truth Social has banned content mentioning abortion and the January 6 hearings. Public Citizen concluded that Truth Social's content moderation was substantially more limiting than Twitter, and said Truth Social's policies were creating an echo chamber of violent views.

Operations

Launch 
Trump made the platform's first post on February 16, 2022. That day, TMTG CEO Devin Nunes said he expected the platform would not completely open to the public until late March. A beta test with 500 users was in operation during February 2022.

On February 21, 2022, Truth Social was released on Apple iOS, reaching number one on the App Store's top charts. Due to an extensive backlog of applicants, upon downloading the app, about 500,000 people who initially attempted to register as users were automatically waitlisted.

The app was installed 872,000 times during its first week, but a month later, new user signup had fallen to 60,000 per week.

Upon its launch, the British automotive solar power company Trailar complained Truth Social's app logo closely resembled its "T" logo.

The platform has been criticized for its poor performance at launch, with waitlisting users attempting to register and extended outages. A day after its launch, The Washington Post described it as "a disaster". A week after, Newsweek reported some early adopters were beginning to lose interest in the app due to low numbers of users and poor engagement, although others were willing to persevere with the app to see if things would improve.

Growth problems 
The Truth Social platform suffered from severe and persistent problems with scalability from launch, limiting the platform's growth.

In early March 2022, multiple sources reported that Truth Social usage remained low, with Trump himself not having posted to his account since his first message two weeks earlier and his account having only 140,000 followers—less than 0.2% of the  followers he had on Twitter before his account was banned. The Daily Dot reported the Truth Social iOS app had fallen from the number one slot for downloads on the Apple App Store to number 84. The Daily Beast reported Trump was dissatisfied with the social network's progress.

At the end of March 2022, TheWrap reported that weekly installations of the Truth Social app had fallen from 872,000 in its launch week to around 60,000 per week, a reduction of over 90%. According to Sensor Tower, Truth Social had been downloaded  times by late March. In early April 2022, Bloomberg News reported that shares in Truth Social's publicly traded holding company Digital World Acquisition Corp. (DWAC) had fallen 31% from the time of the app's launch in late February and 64% from its all-time high.

In early April 2022, Business Insider described Truth Social as "like a conservative ghost town that had been overrun by bots". A U.S.-based reporter for the BBC attempted to sign up in early April and was placed on a waitlist with about  requests ahead of him.

On April 4, it was reported that Josh Adams and Billy Boozer, the platform's chief of technology and chief of product development respectively, had left the company. A report in The Washington Post stated Truth Social was "falling apart", with problems mounting on multiple fronts. A Guardian article compared Truth Social with Trump Steaks and Trump Vodka.

Usership figures were not available, but Trump was reported on August 19, 2022, to have  Truth Social followers.

As of early June 2022, SimilarWeb reported Truth Social's iOS app as ranking #49 in the social networking category of apps on the Apple App Store. As of October 2022, the iOS app had sunk to #75 in the social networking category.

Acquisition of Twitter by Elon Musk 

Following Elon Musk's proposed acquisition of Twitter, many commentators observed that a Musk-run Twitter would be likely to reduce demand for Truth Social's services. Musk said that as of late April 2022, Truth Social iOS app downloads exceeded those of Twitter and TikTok on the same platform. He said Truth Social only existed because of Twitter's restrictions on free speech. Describing Truth Social as a "terrible name", Musk joked that it should be renamed "Trumpet".

Following Musk's comments on Twitter, the Truth Social app rose in popularity, returning to the number 1 position for free iOS apps on Apple's App Store on April 30, with the Twitter app at number 2; DWAC shares also rose in value.

DWAC's share price fell after Musk's announcement of his intention to buy Twitter. Truth Social CEO Devin Nunes later stated that Musk had been encouraged by Trump to buy Twitter; Musk denied this, saying "This is false. I've had no communication, directly or indirectly, with Trump, who has publicly stated that he will be exclusively on Truth Social." Musk subsequently said he intended to reverse Twitter's ban on Trump's Twitter account if his bid for the company was successful. Following Musk's comments, Nunes reiterated that Trump was committed to Truth Social, and would not rejoin Twitter even if his ban were to be lifted.

Following Musk's announcement in July that he no longer intended to purchase Twitter, DWAC shares rose. Musk later went through with the deal, purchased Twitter in October 2022 and lifted the ban on Donald Trump in November. As of late November, Trump had still not posted on Twitter, and has stated that he had no interest in re-joining Twitter, preferring to use Truth Social.

Financial issues 
, Truth Social had not secured any advertising revenue. TMTG stated it "expects to incur significant losses into the foreseeable future".

In late August 2022, Fox Business reported that Truth Social's hosting company RightForge claimed it was owed  by Truth Social and was threatening to take legal action.

In early September 2022, Digital World Acquisition Corp. (DWAC), the SPAC set to acquire TMTG, secured an extension from shareholders for up to six months for it to perform the deal. This left DWAC shares trading at $24, down from a 2021 high of $175. In the same month, Politico writer Jack Shafer wrote about the "slow-cooking financial disaster that has been simmering in Donald Trump's business Crock-Pot".

On September 24, Reuters reported investors had withdrawn commitments of almost , following the expiry of a deadline on September 20.

On November 3, DWAC postponed the shareholder vote on the merger deal for a sixth time.

In March 2023, The Guardian reported that "Federal prosecutors in New York involved in the criminal investigation into Donald Trump’s social media company last year started examining whether it violated money laundering statutes in connection with the acceptance of $8m with suspected Russian ties".

Regulatory issues
In June 2022, federal regulators investigated whether TMTG had illegally coordinated with its holding company, Digital World Acquisition Corp, prior to the latter going public. A federal grand jury was empaneled as part of the investigation. TMTG released a statement saying they are cooperating with the investigation. Due to the investigation, Digital World has not merged with TMTG as planned. Digital World asked its shareholders to vote to allow an extra year to complete the merger, but as of September 6, 2022, it appeared they will not vote in favor of the extra time. If the companies do not merge, Truth Social may not receive  from Digital World.

Donald Trump was revealed to have left the company's board on June 8, prior to the issuing of subpoenas.

World Trademark Review reported that "Truth Social" had been applied for as a trademark in the European Union within a week of the announcement of Trump's company, and registered, potentially preventing the Truth Social service from operating in most of Europe. At the end of August 2022, the U.S. Patent and Trademark Office denied Trump Media & Technology Group's application for a trademark on "Truth Social" as two companies already use the term.

A whistleblower submission was made by Will Wilkerson to the Securities and Exchange Commission in August 2022, with original source information of alleged federal securities law violations, detailing fraudulent misrepresentations  in violation of federal securities laws. Wilkerson was one of the company's earliest employees; he held the post of senior vice president of operations, and was intimately involved in internal TMTG business strategy discussions. He was dismissed from the company in October 2022.

Notable activity

Donald Trump 

Although Donald Trump's participation in TMTG and the scale of his social media following was a major part of TMTG's marketing for Truth Social, Trump was initially not a frequent user of the Truth Social platform. He made the platform's first post on February 16, 2022, with the message "Get ready! Your favorite president will see you soon". His next post was made on April 28, posting "I'M BACK! #COVFEFE", a reference to the covfefe meme. Trump then started posting more frequently.

Following the announcement of Elon Musk's proposed takeover of Twitter, Trump publicly stated that he does not intend to return to Twitter and intends to remain on Truth Social. On May 6, in a court filing responding to the New York attorney general's demand for his cell phones, Trump said Truth Social had recently given him a phone that he only uses to post on Truth Social.

According to reports, Trump has a licensing agreement with TMTG requiring him to use Truth Social as his primary social media platform and to wait at least six hours before reposting material to any other social media platform, with some exceptions for political activities.

In early August 2022, Truth Social experienced a significant uptick in downloads following the FBI search of Mar-a-Lago.

Following the publication of a heavily-redacted affidavit regarding the search, Trump reacted angrily to the contents of the document in a series of Truth Social posts, saying "Affidavit heavily redacted!!! [...] Nothing mentioned on 'Nuclear,' a total public relations subterfuge by the FBI & DOJ, or our close working relationship regarding document turnover - WE GAVE THEM MUCH." The commentator Barbara McQuade observed that Trump's Truth Social posts on the matter might potentially undermine Trump's defense against charges arising from the search.

Trump followed this days later with a sequence of sixty Truth Social posts. Multiple news sources noted that these posts represented a marked increase in the intensity of his rhetoric, explicitly referencing QAnon and 4chan conspiracy theories.

In October 2022, Trump posted a comment criticizing American Jews, telling them to "get their act together and appreciate what they have in Israel" before it's "too late". Three organizations, including the anti-Trump and left-leaning Anti-Defamation League and the left-wing Jewish Democratic Council of America, criticized Trump's comment as condescending and as repeating a "dual loyalty" antisemitic trope. Rabbi Yaakov Menken, Managing Director at the pro-Trump Coalition for Jewish Values, on the contrary, stated that he considered Trump's comment reasonable and not antisemitic.

In November 2022, Trump released a post claiming without evidence that he had "sent in the FBI and the U.S. Attorneys" in 2018 to assist in the Florida gubernatorial election of Ron DeSantis.

On 4 December 2022, Trump used his Truth Social account to say alleged election fraud allows for the "termination" of election rules found in the Constitution of the United States, stating: 

Trump's remarks were condemned by multiple parties, including the White House. In The Week, Damon Linker described it as the moment Trump "finally jumped the shark". Subsequently, Trump denied he called for the termination of the Constitution but maintained that any election misconduct should be undone. Afterward, Trump posted a link to an article claiming that by "allows for," Trump meant that those engaging in voter fraud were effectively terminating the Constitution, not that Trump was calling for the Constitution's termination.

Devin Nunes
Devin Nunes, the CEO of Truth Social, posted a meme on the platform in October 2022 making a joke about the attack on Paul Pelosi, while referencing inaccurate reports that the attacker was in his underwear at the time. Nunes was widely criticized by Twitter users for doing this.

Gavin Newsom
On June 16, 2022, California Governor Gavin Newsom announced he had joined Truth Social, writing on his Twitter account "I just joined Trump's Truth Social. Going to be on there calling out Republican lies. This could get…interesting. My first post -- breaking down America's red state murder problem."

Use by right wing extremists
Axios reported that Truth Social had given a verified account to the white nationalist advocate Nick Fuentes, who has been banned from Twitter and Facebook.

On August 11, 2022, a gunman, identified as Ricky Shiffer, wearing body armor and armed with a nail gun and an AR-15 style rifle attempted to storm the offices of the Federal Bureau of Investigation (FBI) in Cincinnati, Ohio. Following a subsequent police pursuit, he was killed in a standoff with police. Shiffer had published multiple posts on Truth Social in the days before the attack, following the FBI search of Mar-a-Lago, in which he expressed his desire to engage in violence and called for the killings of FBI agents. He also reportedly wrote a post on Truth Social following the attack, which detailed his failed attempt to storm the building. Since Shiffer's actions, some Truth Social users — including a verified account with 74,000 followers who said he was a designer for the site — claimed the attack was a false flag, without providing evidence, and the calls for violence were posts planted by federal law enforcement officials or Democratic operatives.

Bot accounts 
Axios reported in February 2022 that there were official-looking accounts for Fox News, TMZ, the National Football League,  NASA, NASCAR, and others with legitimate-appearing links and logos, which had not been created by the named entities. The accounts were labelled as "bot" accounts. The Fox News account has since been verified by the platform. By April 2022, a bot account for The New York Times was labeled "The Failing NY Times", while a CNN bot account was labeled "CNN (Parody)".

See also

 List of social networking services
 Social media use by Donald Trump

References

External links 

 

2021 establishments in Florida
American social networking websites
Donald Trump and social media
Donald Trump controversies
Donald Trump
Internet properties established in 2021
Microblogging services
Alt-tech
Companies based in Sarasota, Florida
Mastodon (software) instances
Websites with far-right material
Alt-right websites
Freedom of speech